"Don't Give Up" is a 1996 song by the Island Inspirational All-Stars (Kirk Franklin, Hezekiah Walker, Donald Lawrence and Karen Clark Sheard). The song appears on the soundtrack of the 1996 film Don't Be a Menace to South Central While Drinking Your Juice in the Hood. The project of these artists was a part of Island Records' exploration into the gospel music scene. The song peaked in the top 30 of the U.S. R&B chart. Proceeds from the sale of the single were donated to the rebuilding of black churches destroyed by arson. A total of $225,000 was raised from this song for this purpose.

References

1995 songs
Kirk Franklin songs
Island Records singles